Albert Eagle  was an English mathematician and philosopher who wrote several books (some of them privately published) giving his forcefully expressed and somewhat eccentric views on science and mathematics.

Biography

He was an assistant to J. J. Thomson, and was later a lecturer at the Victoria University of Manchester. His best-known book is on elliptic functions, where he uses his idiosyncratic mathematical notation, such as τ instead of π/2, and !n for n factorial. In his other writings he dismissed special relativity, quantum mechanics and natural selection as absurdities.

Eagle's book The Philosophy of Religion versus The Philosophy of Science criticizes the theory of relativity and the philosophy of materialism. Eagle was influenced by Henri Bergson and believed that spiritual forces guide evolution (spiritual evolution). Eagle has been described as a pantheist as he held the view that God is the ultimate substance and the world is but a pattern on his surface.

Eagle proposed that man is composed of four substances: the physical body, the non-physical body, the mind of which ideas and memories are gathered and the inner-ego or personality. Eagle believed that the inner-ego, mind and non-physical body survive death into another world.

Publications

.  Review

 Review by Robert Lerner

References

Bibliography

External links
Religion, Or Science, Or Neither!. Catholic Herald. (April 16, 1937).
Papers by Albert Eagle on ADS

20th-century English philosophers
English mathematicians
Pantheists
Relativity critics
Theistic evolutionists
Vitalists
Year of birth missing
Year of death missing